Vélines is a commune in the Dordogne department in Nouvelle-Aquitaine in southwestern France. Vélines station has rail connections to Bordeaux, Bergerac and Sarlat-la-Canéda.

Population

See also
Communes of the Dordogne department

References

Communes of Dordogne